Gretsa University is a private university in Thika Municipality in Kenya that provides certificate, diploma and degree programmes.

History
Gretsa University opened in September 2006 after receiving the Letter of Interim Authority from the Commission for Higher Education in May 2006.

The university began with three degree programmes in Business, Computer Science and Hospitality Management. The third class of degree students graduated in December 2012. .

Academics
Bachelor of Commerce (BCom) in the following options: Accounting, Business Administration, Credit Management, Human Resource, Management, Enterprise Development, Finance, Marketing, Purchasing and Supply Chain Management
Bachelor of Science in Hospitality Management
Bachelor of Science in Computer Science
Bachelor of Education (Arts) in any two of the following subjects: English, Literature in English, Kiswahili, C.R.E, History, Geography, Mathematics, Business Studies.

The University Offers the following Diplomas and certificates programmes:
 Library and Information Science
 Records and Information Management
 Computer Science
 Information Technology
 Software Development
 Food and Beverage Management
 Food Production
 Travel and tourism 
 Banking and finance
 Accounting
 Business Information Technology
 Human Resource Management
 Project Management
 Marketing
 Credit Management
 Public Relations
 Environmental Health
 Community Health
 Health Records
 Nutrition and Dietetics

Modes of study
Full-time, Evening/Weekends, Open and Distance Learning, School/Holiday-Based

References

External links 
Gretsa University

Private universities and colleges in Kenya
Education in Central Province (Kenya)
2006 establishments in Kenya